Crossplay (the term is a portmanteau of crossdressing and cosplay) is a type of cosplay in which the person dresses up as a character of a different gender. Crossplay's origins lie in the anime convention circuit, though, like cosplay, it has not remained exclusive to the genre. While it is similar to Rule 63 (gender-bending) cosplay, it can be differentiated by the performer becoming completely immersed in the codes of another gender, rather than picking and choosing what behavior enhances the performance.

Female-to-male crossplay

In most countries that play host to hobbyists who would call themselves cosplayers, female-to-male crossplayers (females costumed as male characters, sometimes abbreviated "FtM") are far more common, due to a variety of social and cultural factors.

Many (or even most) females will crossplay for the same reasons that they would cosplay – because they like the character and/or the costume, and wish to represent that. In Japan, female costumers tend to dominate (in numbers) the field of cosplay in general, often portraying a huge assortment of colorful characters regardless of gender.

As bishōnen are portrayed in manga and anime as liminal beings, it is considered "easier" for a female to cross-play as a bishōnen than it would be for her to crossplay as a male character from a Western series.

Male-to-female crossplay

Male-to-female crossplayers, (males costumed as female characters, sometimes abbreviated "MtF"), are somewhat more common outside Japan.
Originally, in America, a popular anime series for MtF crossplayers was Sailor Moon, creating "humorous effect and social levity".

See also
Mana – figurehead of Japan's Gothic Lolita fashion movement.
Cross-dressing
Gender bender

References

External links

An article about Crossplay on TokyoPop's website
"Sailor Bubba," recognized by a popular amateur convention journalist
BBC story on cosplay and conventions (RealVideo)

Cosplay
Cross-dressing